Werner Kuhn (born 19 May 1955) is a German politician who served as a Member of the European Parliament (MEP) from 2009 until 2019. He is a member of the Christian Democratic Union, part of the European People's Party.

Parliamentary service
Kuhn has served in several of the Parliamentary committees. From 2014 he served as Vice-Chair of the Committee on Fisheries. He has also served on the Committee on Transport and Tourism, the delegation to the ACP–EU Joint Parliamentary Assembly and the Delegation for relations with Israel.

References

1955 births
Living people
Christian Democratic Union of Germany MEPs
MEPs for Germany 2009–2014
MEPs for Germany 2014–2019
Members of the Bundestag for Mecklenburg-Western Pomerania
Members of the Bundestag 2002–2005
Members of the Bundestag 1998–2002
Members of the Bundestag 1994–1998
People from Zingst
Members of the Bundestag for the Christian Democratic Union of Germany